Songs for Sentimentalists is an album released by Cathy Carr on the RCA Victor label in 1964.

It marks the end of Carr's attempts to revive her commercial pop career, instead opting for an album of standards from the early 20th century.

The Dynagroove process was applied to this album. As of 2009, it has not been rereleased on CD.

Track listing
Side 1:
 "Let Me Call You Sweetheart" (Leo Friedman - Beth Slater Whitson) – 2:14
 "When I Lost You" (Irving Berlin) – 2:33
 "Show Me the Way to Go Home" (James Campbell - Reginald Connelly) – 2:02
 "All by Myself" (Irving Berlin) – 2:23
 "My Melancholy Baby" (Ernie Burnett - George A. Norton) – 3:05
 "I'm Always Chasing Rainbows" (Harry Carroll - Joseph McCarthy) – 1:45

Side 2:
 "Me and My Shadow" (Al Jolson - Billy Rose - Dave Dreyer) – 2:20
 "After You've Gone" (Turner Layton - Henry Creamer) – 2:15
 "Embraceable You" (George Gershwin - Ira Gershwin) – 2:31
 "It Had to Be You" (Isham Jones - Gus Kahn) – 2:42
 "One for My Baby" (Harold Arlen - Johnny Mercer) – 3:05
 "I'll See You in My Dreams" (Isham Jones - Gus Kahn) – 2:44

1964 albums
Cathy Carr albums
RCA Victor albums